Chaetostephana is a genus of moths of the family Noctuidae.

Species
 Chaetostephana inclusa (Karsch, 1895)
 Chaetostephana rendalli (Rothschild, 1896)

References
afromoths
 Chaetostephana at Markku Savela's Lepidoptera and Some Other Life Forms

Agaristinae